Karin Giannone (born 1974) is a South African-born British news presenter working in the United Kingdom. She is a London-based main presenter on BBC World News.

Career
Giannone edited the student magazine Varsity magazine at Cambridge, which led to work experience at Anglia Television and on graduation in 1997 she joined the regional ITV station in Norwich as a news trainee, producing, reporting and presenting for regional news bulletins. In 1999 her language and broadcasting skills helped her land a role as a reporter and presenter for Channel 4's Football Italia series, where she covered the Italian Soccer scene for a season, flying between the UK and Italy every week. She returned to Anglia in 2000 as a presenter and reporter, this time for the programme for the east of the region covering Norfolk, Suffolk and Essex. She also followed troops from the region for a series of reports from Afghanistan in 2002.

Giannone then moved to London to present a variety of shifts for Sky News, before joining BBC News in 2005. Her work assignments have included a stint presenting World News Today on the BBC World News channel from Washington at 10:00 pm EST during July/August 2008.

She presented live coverage from South Africa following the death of Nelson Mandela in 2013.

From 3 March 2014, Giannone presented live coverage on the BBC News Channel at the trial of Oscar Pistorius in Pretoria, South Africa. She anchored the BBC's French presidential election coverage in 2017 from Paris, Italian elections in 2018 from Rome, and the Indian election from Delhi in 2019.

She was the regular presenter of BBC World News from 0700-1000GMT Wednesdays and Thursdays including programmes such as Worklife with Sally Bundock at 830am in the UK, Friday 1600-1900 and Sunday 1800-2300 (including World News Today at 9pm on the BBC News Channel).

On February 2 2023, it was confirmed that Giannone – alongside many other presenters of the domestic BBC News Channel – would lose their presenting roles as part of the BBC's relaunched news channel.

References

External links

1974 births
Living people
Alumni of Newnham College, Cambridge
People educated at George Watson's College
People educated at Cranbrook School, Kent
People from Johannesburg
British television presenters
South African emigrants to the United Kingdom
South African television journalists
BBC newsreaders and journalists
BBC World News
South African people of Italian descent